Baoma is a small town in Bo District in the Southern Province of Sierra Leone. As of 2009 it had an estimated population of 7,044.

References

Populated places in Sierra Leone